The Scheibe SF-27 Zugvogel V is a single seat Standard Class sailplane, designed and built in Germany in the 1960s. A motorised version was also produced. Significant numbers remain active.

Design and development

The SF-27 is a shoulder-wing, single seat Standard Class sailplane, succeeding the Scheibe Zugvogel IIIB in production. It was designed to 1960s Standard Class competition rules requiring a span of no more than 15 m and a fixed undercarriage. Built of wood and steel, its structure was conservative; at a time when many manufacturers were using glassfibre structurally in wings and fuselages, the  SF-27 only used it to cover the forward fuselage.

The wing of the SF-27 is built around a single beechwood boxspar, with plywood ribs and a leading edge torsion box.  The wing covering is largely ply, entirely so over the outer section. The inner section is covered with ply from the leading edge to behind the spar, the rest with a mixture of ply and fabric. Ailerons and Schempp-Hirth airbrakes are likewise ply covered. The cantilever horizontal tail is an all-moving ply and fabric covered surface, set at the top of the fuselage; the fin is covered with ply  and the rudder with fabric.

The fuselage is a welded steel structure covered, from nose to wing trailing edge, with a glassfibre shell. The wing root fairing is also glassfibre.  Further aft the fuselage is fabric covered over wooden stringers.  The cockpit, within the glassfibre shell, has a single piece Plexiglas canopy, the pilot sitting in a semi-reclined position.  The SF-27 has a fixed monowheel undercarriage, fitted with brakes, plus a small tailwheel.

The SF-27 first flew on 12 May 1964.  30 had been built by February 1966, the final total being about 120. Scheibe also produced a motorised version, the SF-27M, with a 26 hp (19 kW) 4-cylinder Hirth F-102 A2 two stroke engine on a retractable mast above the wing behind the cockpit.  Its gross weight is increased to 386 kg (850 lb) and it is  longer, with a best glide ratio 32:1.

Operational history

Around 58 of the original 120 Sf-27s are still active in 2010, including several SF-27Ms.

Variants
SF-27A
Standard class sailplane.
SF-27B
One-off 17 m span version.
SF-27M
Motorised version.
SLCA-10 Topaze
Licence built variant built in France by Société Lorraine de Constructions Aéronautiques (SLCA)

Specifications (SF-27A)

References

Notes

Bibliography

1960s German sailplanes
SF-27
Shoulder-wing aircraft
Aircraft first flown in 1964